The Latin American Center for Human Economy (sometimes CLAEH) is a Uruguayan non-profit organization and university founded in 1957. Based in Montevideo, its doctrinal inspiration comes from the current of Economics and Humanism, promoted since the 1940s by the Breton Dominican priest Louis-Joseph Lebret on Économie et humanisme, which affirms the values of the human person, solidarity and commitment to social change at the service of development.

History 
In October 1997, 50 years after its foundation, CLAEH was officially recognized as a University Institute, and in 2017, the Ministry of Education and Culture recognized it as a University.

Schools 

 School of Medicine (Punta del Este Campus)
 School of Culture (Punta del Este Campus)
 Law School (Punta del Este Campus)

Source:

Undergraduate courses

Postgraduate courses

Masters' degrees

See also 
 List of universities in Uruguay

References 
 This article incorporates public domain material from School: Latin American Center for Human Economics (CLAEH) at the University Innovation Fellows wiki.

External links 

 Official Website

Universities in Uruguay
Education in Montevideo
Organizations established in 1957
1957 establishments in Uruguay